Lefkara may refer to:

 Kato Lefkara, a village in Cyprus
 Pano Lefkara, a municipality in Cyprus